The Town of Gayndah is a former local government area in the Wide Bay–Burnett area in Queensland, Australia, centred on Gayndah. It existed from 1876 to 1924.

History

On 3 April 1876, Gayndah was established as a separate municipality, the Borough of Gayndah, under the Municipal Institutions Act 1864

With the passage of the Local Authorities Act 1902, the Borough of Gayndah became the Town of Gayndah on 31 March 1903.

On 24 May 1924, the Town of Gayndah was abolished and absorbed into the Shire of Gayndah.

Mayors

The following men were the mayor of Gayndah:
 1880: Miller
 1884: J.J.Cadell
 1885: Cornwall
 1887: Seeney 
 1898: Patrick McNamara
 1899: Patrick McNamara
 1900: Walker
 1909: M. C. Stephenson

References

Former local government areas of Queensland
Gayndah
1924 disestablishments in Australia